Bernburg (Saale) is a town in Saxony-Anhalt, Germany, capital of the Salzlandkreis district. The former residence of the Anhalt-Bernburg princes is known for its Renaissance castle.

Geography
The town centre is situated in the fertile Magdeburg Börde lowland on the Saale river, approx.  downstream from Halle and  up stream from Magdeburg. It is dominated by the huge Bernburg Castle featuring a museum as well as a popular, recently updated bear pit in its moat.

The municipal area comprises the town Bernburg proper and eight Ortschaften or municipal divisions: 
Aderstedt (incorporated in 2003), Baalberge, Biendorf, Gröna, Peißen, Poley, Preußlitz, and Wohlsdorf, all incorporated on 1 January 2010.

Bernburg is a stop on the scenic Romanesque Road (Strasse der Romanik).

History
Several archaeological sites in the area refer to the Walternienburg-Bernburg Culture, a mid-neolithic funnelbeaker culture from about 3200 to 2800 BC. Agriculture on the fertile Loess soil was already common in prehistoric times. Around 150 AD, a local settlement named Luppia was mentioned in the Geography by Ptolemy. In the Early Middle Ages, the Saale river marked the border between the German stem duchies in the west and the lands of the Polabian Slavs in the east.

The present-day borough of Waldau (which became part of Bernburg in 1871) was first mentioned in a 782 deed and again in 806 as Waladala in the chronicles of Moissac Abbey; the village church dedicated to St Stephen first appeared in 964, the nowadays building dates from around 1150. Bernburg itself was first mentioned as civitas Brandanburg in a 961 deed issued by King Otto I of Germany. According to the Annalista Saxo, Berneburch Castle, then a possession of the Ascanian prince Albert the Bear, was set on fire by his enemies in 1138. In 1252 the rebuilt castle became the residence of Albert's great-grandson Prince Bernhard I of Anhalt-Bernburg.

Bernburg memorial

In the Nazi era during World War II, a wing of the town's mental hospital was used for the so-called T-4 Euthanasia Programme. The site today houses a memorial to commemorate the suffering of more than 14,000 victims.

Gallery

Twin towns – sister cities

Bernburg is twinned with:
 Anderson, United States (1998)
 Fourmies, France (1967)
 Rheine, Germany (1990)
 Tarnowskie Góry, Poland (1983)
 Chomutov, Czech Republic (1992)

Notable people

Honorary citizen 

Date of award
 April 10, 1890: Otto von Bismarck (1815–1898)
 April 7, 1937 – March 26, 1946: Hermann Göring (1893–1946)
 June 12, 1938 – March 26, 1946: Johann Ludwig Graf Schwerin von Krosigk (1887–1977)
All appointments of honorary citizens and the like from 1933 to 1945 were annulled.
 February 24, 1950: Johannes R. Becher (1891–1958)
 February 19, 1953: Hermann Henselmann (1905–1995)
 February 5, 1967 – ?: Hilde Benjamin (1902–1989)

Sons and daughters of the city 
  
 Christoph Rothmann (1550–1600), mathematician and astronomer of the 16th century
 Sibylla of Anhalt (1564–1614), Duchess of Württemberg
 Wilhelm Heinrich Sebastian Bucholz (1734–1798), official physician
 Heinrich Friedrich von Diez (1751–1817), diplomat and orientalist
 Isaak Markus Jost (1793–1860), historian

 Ferdinand Reich (1799–1882), chemist and physicist
 Herrman S. Saroni (1824–1900), writer, composer and inventor
 Hans Reinowski (1900–1977), politician
 Herbert Weißbach (1901–1995), actor
 Ernst Busch (1900–1980), East German singer and actor, Busch was awarded the Lenin Peace Prize for 1970–71
 Hilde Benjamin (1902–1989), presiding judge in a series of political trials in the 1950s and Justice Minister of the GDR
 Ruth Lange (1908–1994), shot putter and discus thrower
 Otto Knefler (1923–1986), soccer coach and player
 Gerhard Dünnhaupt (born 1927), bibliographer and cultural historian
 Michael Müller (born 1948), politician
 Rolf Milser (born 1951), weight lifter
 Heike Hartwig (born 1962), athlete
 Ingo Weißenborn (born 1963), fencer

People who have worked on the ground 

 Christian II, Prince of Anhalt-Bernburg (1767–1834), Prince and Duke of Anhalt-Bernburg
 Friedrich Adolf Krummacher (1767–1845), theologian, general superintendent in Bernburg 1812–1824

 Wilhelm von Kügelgen (1802–1867), early-romantic painter and author, in the service of the court of Bernburg
 Richard Wagner (1813–1883), worked in 1834 in the Bernburg Hoftheater (Mozart operas)
 Hermann Hellriegel (1831–1895), biologist and agricultural scientist in Bernburg 1880–1895
 Wilhelm Krüger (1857–1947), 25 years director of the agricultural test station Bernburg

See also
Bernburg Euthanasia Centre
Wacker Bernburg (1910-1945)

References

External links 

 Official Website of the city (in German)
 Bernburg Zoo at Zoo-Infos.de (in English)
 Bernburg Castle

 
Salzlandkreis
Duchy of Anhalt